is a compilation album by Japanese entertainer Akina Nakamori, released through Utahime Records and Universal Sigma on January 11, 2006 to commemorate Nakamori's 25th anniversary. The album consists of the singles "Akai Hana", "Hajimete Deatta Hi no Yō ni", and "Rakka Ryūsui", plus self-covers of her classic singles from the Warner Pioneer era.

Background
The album cover features Nakamori's handprint. The first edition of the album was available in five different colors.

To commemorate Nakamori's 25th anniversary, Universal Sigma launched a mobile phone campaign from January 11 to 24. Fans sent messages to Nakamori's hotline; the winning messages were selected to be read by Nakamori herself, and campaign winners received autographed goods.

Charting performance
The album peaked at No. 29 on Oricon's weekly albums chart and charted for eight weeks. It sold over 16,000 copies.

Track listing

Charts

References

External links
 
 
 

2006 compilation albums
Akina Nakamori compilation albums
Japanese-language compilation albums
Self-covers albums
Universal Sigma compilation albums